Braloștița is a commune in Dolj County, Oltenia, Romania with a population of 4,200 people. It is composed of six villages: Braloștița, Ciocanele, Racovița, Schitu, Sfârcea and Valea Fântânilor.

Natives
 Daniel Celea

References

Communes in Dolj County
Localities in Oltenia